Any Answers? is the companion programme to BBC Radio 4's Any Questions?, in which a panel of notable figures drawn from politics, media or the arts are asked for their views on current affairs by members of an invited audience assembled in a public venue.

History
The programme – which began in October 1954 – was originally based on letters from listeners to Any Questions?, but has subsequently followed the trend to the less laborious and more immediate "phone-in" format. Currently listeners can submit their responses to the views expressed in Any Questions? by email, text message, or telephone. A moderator hosts the programme, ensuring that sufficient time is devoted to responses to each issue covered in the previous edition of Any Questions?.

Any Answers? – today broadcast by BBC Radio 4 – was initially part of the schedule of the BBC Light Programme (which became BBC Radio 2 in September 1967). Its first presenter was Freddie Grisewood. Jonathan Dimbleby hosted the programme from 1989 to 2012; he then stepped down, but continued to present Any Questions?. Anita Anand took over as host on 9 June 2012. Any Answers? is broadcast on Saturday afternoons immediately after the repeat edition of Any Questions? has been aired.

References

External links
 

BBC Radio 4 programmes